Jenette Elise Goldstein (born February 4, 1960) is an American actress. She is known for starring as Private Vasquez in the sci-fi horror film Aliens (1986), which won her the Saturn Award for Best Supporting Actress. She also played Diamondback in Near Dark (1987) which earned her a second Saturn Award nomination, Megan Shapiro in Lethal Weapon 2 (1989) and Janelle Voight in Terminator 2 (1991). She made cameo appearances in Star Trek Generations (1994) and Titanic (1997) and appeared in two episodes of the television series Star Trek: Short Treks (2019).

Early life
Goldstein was born in Los Angeles, California, and raised in Beverly Hills. Her family is Jewish (from Russia, Morocco, and Brazil).

Career
Goldstein's first film role was in James Cameron's Aliens (1986), as the character PFC Jenette Vasquez. She also appeared as the vampire Diamondback in Near Dark (1987), Officer Meagan Shapiro in Lethal Weapon 2 (1989), Janelle Voight in Terminator 2: Judgment Day (1991), the  science officer in Star Trek Generations (1994), and an Irish immigrant mother in Titanic (1997).

Goldstein is now the proprietor of the store "Jenette Bras", a large-cup bra specialist known for its slogan "The alphabet starts at 'D'.

Filmography

Film and television

Video games

Awards and nominations
 Saturn Awards
 1987: Best Supporting Actress – Aliens (Won)
 1988: Best Supporting Actress – Near Dark (Nominated)
 DVD Exclusive Awards
 2003: Best Audio Commentary (New for DVD) – Aliens (Nominated) with James Cameron, Michael Biehn, Carrie Henn, Christopher Henn, Lance Henriksen, Gale Anne Hurd, Pat McClung, Bill Paxton, Dennis Skotak, Robert Skotak and Stan Winston

References

External links
 
 Jenette Goldstein  at Cinemorgue

1960 births
20th-century American actresses
21st-century American actresses
Actresses from Beverly Hills, California
Actresses from Los Angeles
American businesspeople in retailing
American film actresses
American people of Brazilian-Jewish descent
American people of Moroccan-Jewish descent
American people of Russian-Jewish descent
American television actresses
Businesspeople from Los Angeles
Jewish American actresses
Living people
21st-century American Jews